Nordenskiöld Fjord or Nordenskjöld Fjord is a fjord in Peary Land, northern Greenland.

Geography
To the northwest the fjord opens into the Lincoln Sea of the Arctic Ocean. It separates the island of Nares Land, to the west of the fjord, from Freuchen Land to the east. A narrow sound between Nares Land and the mainland connects inner Nordenskiöld Fjord with Victoria Fjord. John Murray Island and Elison Island are located at its northern end off its mouth.   Part of the middle and all of the inner fjord are covered by the large Jungerson Glacier.

See also
List of fjords of Greenland
Peary Channel (Greenland)
Peary Land

References

External links
Exploration of Northern Greenland

Fjords of Greenland
Peary Land